Naqib Kola-ye Salas (also Romanized as Naqīb Kolā-ye S̄alās̱ and Naqīb Kolā-ye S̄alās; also known as Naqīb Kalā Joneyd, Naqīb Kolā, and Naqīb Kolā Joneyd) is a village in Ganjafruz Rural District, in the Central District of Babol County, Mazandaran Province, Iran. At the 2006 census, its population was 458, in 116 families.

References 

Populated places in Babol County